The Communications Regulatory Authority of Namibia (CRAN), established by the Namibian Communication Act (Act No. 8 of 2009) on 18 May 2011 with the mandate to regulate postal and telecommunication services. It emerged from the former Namibia Communications Commission. CRAN is accountable to the Ministry of Information and Communication Technology of  Namibia.

See also
 Media of Namibia
 Telecommunications in Namibia

References

External links
Ministry Of Information And Communication Technology
CRAN

Government of Namibia
Communications in Namibia
2011 establishments in Namibia